

List of Pilgrim Centres in Wayanad 
Mor Baselious Jacobite Syrian Church, Cheeyambam, Pulpally on foot pilgrimage from churches in Malabar on fest of St.Yeldho Mar Baselios, It is also known as one and only all religious pilgrim center .
Thirunelly Temple and Papanashini, Thirunelly, it is believed that the temple is more than 1,000 years old.
Valliyoorkkavu Bhagavathi Temple is an important worship place for the Wayanad tribal communities.
Lourde Matha Shrine, Pallikunnu Church was built by a French priest Fr. Jefreno in 1908. 
Kallody church St. George Forane Church Kallody, Wayanad, one of the old Church.

Varambetta Mosque Mananthavady, an old Mosque which is about 300 years old.
Malankarakunnu St. Thomas Church, Oldest Malankara Jacobite Syriac Orthodox Church in Malabar region.
Seetha Lava Kusha Temple, Temple is a place dedicated to celestial worship and has a distinctive position among the Kerala temples.
Puliyarmala Jain temple is also called as Anathanatha swami temple.
Assumption Forane Church, Sulthan Bathery, French Missionaries who started the church in 1900.

References

Religious buildings and structures in Wayanad district